Basmath is a city and a municipal council in Hingoli district  in the state of Maharashtra, India.

Demographics
 India census, Basmath had a population of 57,360. Males constitute 52% of the population and females 48%. Basmath has an average literacy rate of 65%, higher than the national average of 59.5%; with 58% of the males and 42% of females literate. 16% of the population is under 6 years of age.

References

Cities and towns in Hingoli district
Talukas in Maharashtra